Ethyl protocatechuate is a phenolic compound. It can be found in the peanut seed testa. It is also present in wine. It is the ethylic ester of protocatechuic acid.

The compound is a prolyl 4-hydroxylase inhibitor and can be used to protect the myocardium.

See also 
 Phenolic content in wine

References 

Dihydroxybenzoic acids
Hydrolase inhibitors